= Chubulga =

Populated place in Russia

Chubulga is a populated place in Yakutia, Russia.
